John David Risher (born July 15, 1965) is an American businessman and philanthropist. He is the CEO and co-founder of Worldreader, a non-profit organization that aims to get children reading so they can reach their potential, and the co-founder of #HalfMyDAF whose goal is inspire more philanthropic giving.

Risher served as an executive at Microsoft Corporation, and was Senior Vice President of US Retail at Amazon.com from 1997 to 2002. In November 2009, together with Colin McElwee, he founded Worldreader.

Early life and background 
Risher was raised by his divorced parents, living primarily with his mother in Chevy Chase, Maryland.

In 1987 he graduated from Princeton University, where he majored in Comparative Literature and wrote his thesis on “The Changing Attitudes towards Language in Samuel Beckett’s early Metafiction.”

After graduating from college, he worked at L.E.K. Consulting, He bicycled across the United States before entering Harvard Business School, from which he graduated in 1991 with an MBA.

Career 
At Microsoft, Risher was General Manager in charge of launching the company's first database product, Access. He went on to found and manage Microsoft Investor. In 1997, he left Microsoft over Bill Gates' objections to join Amazon.com as its first Vice President of Product and Store development. He later served as the company's Senior Vice President, US Retail, leading the marketing and expanding into new categories to grow Amazon's retail sales from $15 million to $4 billion. As a tribute to Risher's leadership, Jeff Bezos created a hidden perpetual "easter egg" on the Amazon website when he left the company.

After leaving Amazon in 2002, Risher taught at the University of Washington’s Foster Business School, where he created the University’s course on “Competing on the Internet.” He was elected Professor of the Year in 2004.

Risher co-founded Worldreader after a year-long, 19-country trip around the world with his family, road-schooling his daughters and volunteering. After visiting an orphanage in Ecuador, Risher saw how technology could help traditionally underserved children read.

Worldreader is a US-based 501(c)(3) and European public charity with additional registrations in Kenya, Ghana, India, and the United Kingdom. Worldreader believes that “readers build a better world" and works with partners to get children reading so they can reach their potential. In March 2010, Worldreader launched a trial in Ayenyah, Ghana. Worldreader reports that, after receiving positive results, they were granted permission from Ghana's Ministry of Education to distribute e-readers to additional schools in Ghana. Since then, the organization has helped over 20 million readers in the United States and globally across more than 100 countries. Worldreader's BookSmart reading app offers children books and learning activities in six languages.

Risher is Schwab Foundation Social Entrepreneur of the year, a Microsoft Alumni Foundation Integral Fellow, and Draper Richards Kaplan Foundation Social Entrepreneur. He serves on the board of directors of Lyft, Inc, on the International Advisory Board of ESADE, and sits on the International Advisory Board of Catalunya.

Philanthropy 
In May 2020, Risher and his wife, author Jennifer Risher, created the #HalfMyDAF challenge, with a goal of motivating donors to increase their charitable giving from Donor Advised Funds. Within 24 hours of the challenge's launch, donors had committed over $400,000 to support non-profits; within three months, over $4.7 million had been granted, with the total reaching $8.6 million by the end of 2020. As of the end of 2022, the organization had awarded and inspired over $30 million of charitable giving.

Risher is Worldreader's Board President and serves on the board of directors of the Barbara Bush Foundation for Family Literacy.

Recognition 
 One of Silicon Valley's 25 Most Influential People
 Honorary Doctor of Letters, Wilson College
Draper Richards Kaplan Social Entrepreneur
 Clinton Global Initiative 2014 Invited Member
 Microsoft Alumni Foundation Integral Fellow 2011 
 Publishers Weekly's “Eleven for the Millennium
 Schwab Foundation's Social Entrepreneur of the Year 
 Robb Report Maverick Philanthropist

References

1965 births
Living people
Princeton University alumni
Harvard Business School alumni
University of Washington faculty
Microsoft employees